Souksamay Manhmanyvong  is a Laotian footballer who plays as a forward.

References 

Living people
1986 births
Laotian footballers
Laos international footballers
Association football forwards
Yotha F.C. players